Iceland was represented at the Eurovision Song Contest 1988 by Beathoven with the song "Þú og þeir (Sókrates)". Beathoven was the winner of the Icelandic national final, Söngvakeppni Sjónvarpsins 1988, organised by Icelandic broadcaster Ríkisútvarpið (RÚV).

Before Eurovision

Söngvakeppni Sjónvarpsins 1988 
The final was held on 21 March 1988 at the RÚV studios in Reykjavík, hosted by Hermann Gunnarsson. 10 songs competed, which were all shown as pre-recorded video clips, and the winner was chosen by the votes of 8 regional juries.

At Eurovision 
Stormsker and Hilmarsson, now as Beathoven, performed first on the night of the contest, held in Dublin, Ireland, preceding Sweden. Iceland received 20 points, placing 16th of 21 competing countries. The Icelandic jury awarded its 12 points to Yugoslavia.

The members of the Icelandic jury included Árni Gunnarsson, Ásgeir Guðnason, Davíð Sveinsson, Elín Þóra Stefánsdóttir, Ellý Þorðardóttir, Erla Björk Jónasdóttir, Guðrún Kristmannsdóttir, Hólmfríður Jónsdóttir, Jónas Engilbertsson, Jónína Bachmann, Kjartan Þor Kjartansson, Ólafur Egilsson, Sigrún Kristjánsdóttir, Sigurður Fanndal, Sigurður Ægisson, and Þórdís Garðarsdóttir.

Voting

References

External links 
Icelandic National Final 1988

1988
Countries in the Eurovision Song Contest 1988
Eurovision